Moer Yhan "Peabo" De Doue (born December 28, 1991, in Takoma Park, Maryland) is a former American soccer player who played as a defender.

Career

Early career
Doue began playing youth soccer for MSC United, coached by Julio Arjona. He also spent three seasons playing for Bethesda SC Roadrunners. Doue started out as a three-year varsity starter at Clarksburg High School in which he scored 44 goals while captaining the school team for his junior and senior years. While attended High-School Doue also played for the D.C. United Academy for which he was a 2008 MLS U-17 Cup finalist for. In 2009, he attended West Virginia University where he stayed until 2012.

Phoenix
On March 13, 2013, it was announced that Doue had signed with new USL Pro franchise Phoenix FC for the season. Then on March 23, 2013, he made his debut for the team against Los Angeles Blues in their first game ever in which the team lost 2–0.

Oklahoma City Energy
On February 18, 2014 Oklahoma City Energy FC of the USL Pro announced the signing of Peabo Doue. He made his debut against Orange County Blues on April 6, 2014, in which he assisted a goal in a 2–0 victory for the Energy.

Wilmington Hammerheads
After two seasons with Oklahoma City, Doue signed with USL club Wilmington Hammerheads.

Jacksonville Armada
On January 30, 2017, Doue signed with North American Soccer League side Jacksonville Armada.

North Carolina FC
On January 4, 2018, Doue signed with USL side North Carolina FC.

Upon signing with North Carolina FC he appeared on the popular podcast Raleigh City Sports.

Loudoun United
On February 26, 2019, Doue signed with USL Championship side Loudoun United FC. He was re-signed by Loudoun on January 7, 2020.

Doue announced his retirement from playing professionally on September 25, 2020.

Career statistics

Club
Statistics accurate as of November 1, 2019

References

1991 births
Living people
American soccer players
West Virginia Mountaineers men's soccer players
Phoenix FC players
OKC Energy FC players
Wilmington Hammerheads FC players
Jacksonville Armada FC players
North Carolina FC players
Loudoun United FC players
Association football midfielders
Sportspeople from Montgomery County, Maryland
USL Championship players
Soccer players from Maryland